Upalco is an unincorporated community in eastern Duchesne County, Utah, United States.

Description

Upalco was originally named Lake Fork, after the nearby Lake Fork River, which flows southerly to the west of the community. The name Upalco came from the initial letters of Utah Power and Light Company, which provided funding for an associated, but unidentified project. (Big Sand State Park, a former Utah state park, was located at the reservoir.)

Road access to Upalco is primarily by State Route 87 (SR-87), which passes north–south through the community.

History
The section of highway that passes north–south through Upalco (and is now designated as SR-87) was previously part of the former State Route 86 (SR-86). From 1935 to 1964 the road that ran from U.S. Route 40 (US-40) in Bridgeland northerly to Altonah (via Upalco and Altamont) was designated as SR-86. (Prior to 1977, this section of US-40 was also designated as State Route 6 [SR-6]). Near the southern edge of Uplaco was a junction on SR-86, from which SR-87 ran east, via Ioka, to Ioka Junction (the junction of US-40 [SR-6] and SR-87, southwest of Roosevelt).

In 1964, the section of the former SR-86 from the junction near the southern edge of Upalco northerly (through the community) to Altamont, was added to the west end of SR-87. (The section of the former SR-86 from Altamont north to Altonah was transferred to the newly designated State Route 221.) In 1969, what left of SR-86 (the approximate  between US-40 [SR-6] near Bridgland and Upalco which remained after the 1964 changes) was deleted from the state highway system. (The following year, sections of the former SR-221, the former State Route 134, and the current State Route 35 were added to the north [west] end of SR-87. The result was the current routing SR-87, which runs northerly from Duchesne to Altamont, via Boneta, and then southwesterly to Ioka Junction, via Upalco and Ioka.)

See also

Notes

References

External links

Unincorporated communities in Duchesne County, Utah
Unincorporated communities in Utah